Bhawanipatna is a Vidhan Sabha constituency of Kalahandi district, Odisha.

This constituency includes Bhawanipatna, Kesinga, 25 Gram panchayats (Madiguda, Chahagaon, Karlapada, Chheliamal, Kalam, Karlaguda, Thuapadar, Dadpur, Deypur, Gudialipadar, Kamthana, Kuliamal, Gand-Barajhola, Medinipur, Seinpur, Palsijharan, Udepur, Matia, Borda, Kendupati, Gurujung, Borbhata, Dumuria, Artal and Palana) of Bhawanipatna block and 17GPs (Adhamunda, Balsi, Boria, Chancher, Deogaon, Fatakmal, Gaigaon, Gokuleswar, Kandel, Kikia, Kundabandha, Laitara, Nasigaon, Pastikudi, Patharla, Sirol and Utkela) of Kesinga block.

Elected Members

Sixteen elections were held between 1951 and 2014 including one By election in 1957.
Elected members from the Bhawanipatna constituency are:

1951: (18): J . C . Singh Deo (Ganatantra Parishad)
1957: (26): Karunakar Bhoi (Ganatantra Parishad)
1957: (Bye Poll): C. S. Pradhan (Ganatantra Parishad)
1961: (34): Anchal Majhi (Ganatantra Parishad)
1967: (93): Dayanidhi Naik (Congress)
1971: (93): Dayanidhi Naik (Jana Congress)
1974: (99): Jagamohan Nayak (Swatantra Party)
1977: (99): Dayanidhi Naik (Congress)
1980: (99): Dayanidhi Naik (Congress-I)
1985: (99): Bhakta Charan Das (Janata Party)
1990: (99): Ajit Das (Janata Dal)
1995: (99): Pradipta Kumar Naik (BJP)
1995: (99): Pradipta Kumar Naik (BJP)
2000: (99): Pradipta Kumar Naik (BJP)
2004: (99): Pradipta Kumar Naik (BJP)
2009: (80): Dusmanta Naik (Congress)
2014: (80): Anam Naik (BJD)
2019: (80): Pradipta Kumar Naik (BJP)

Election Results

2019

2014

2009 Election

Notes

References

Assembly constituencies of Odisha
Kalahandi district